Rosetown-Elrose is a provincial electoral district for the Legislative Assembly of Saskatchewan, Canada. The largest community is Rosetown with a population of 2,277. Smaller communities in the district include the towns of Outlook (pop. 1,936), Elrose (pop. 496), Kyle, Zealandia, and Eston; and the villages of Dinsmore, Harris, Beechy, Lucky Lake, and Conquest.

This constituency was created for the 1975 election from the districts of Rosetown and Elrose. It was replaced by Rosetown-Biggar in 1995 but brought back by the Representation Act, 2002 in 2003.

Members of the Legislative Assembly

Election results

|-
 
|NDP
|Tom Howe
|align="right"|1,121
|align="right"|16.00
|align="right"|-3.99

|- bgcolor="white"
!align="left" colspan=3|Total
!align="right"|7,007
!align="right"|100.00
!align="right"|

|-
 
|NDP
|Eric Anderson
|align="right"|1,592
|align="right"|19.99
|align="right"|-7.07

|- bgcolor="white"
!align="left" colspan=3|Total
!align="right"|7,964
!align="right"|100.00%
!align="right"|

|-
 
|NDP
|Jack Randall Mason
|align="right"|2,200
|align="right"|27.06
|align="right"|–

|- bgcolor="white"
!align="left" colspan=3|Total
!align="right"|8,131
!align="right"|100.00
!align="right"|

References

External links 
Website of the Legislative Assembly of Saskatchewan
Saskatchewan Archives Board – Saskatchewan Election Results By Electoral Division

Saskatchewan provincial electoral districts
Rosetown